The Defence Institute of High Altitude Research (DIHAR) is a defence laboratory of the Defence Research and Development Organisation (DRDO) located in Leh city of Ladakh in  India. It conducts research on cold arid agro-animal technologies.

History 

In 2020, with an intent to make the DRDO leaner and more effective, it was proposed to merge the Defence Institute of Bio-Energy Research (DIBER), "Defence Institute of High Altitude Research" (DIHAR), and Defence Research Laboratory (DRL). The collaboration with the Defence Food Research Laboratory and the Central Food Technological Research Institute of the Council of Scientific and Industrial Research (CSIR) will be enhanced.

Administration  

DIHAR is headed by a director. The present director of DIHAR is Dr. Om Prakash Chaurasia.

See also

 Research 
 Siachen Base Camp (India)
 List of Antarctic research stations
 List of Antarctic field camps
 List of highest astronomical observatories

 Borders
 Actual Ground Position Line (AGPL), India-Pakistan border across Siachen region
 Line of Actual Control (LAC), India-China border across Ladakh
 Line of Control (LoC), India-Pakistan border across Ladakh and Jammu and Kashmir

 Conflicts
 Sino-Indian War
 Indo-Pakistani wars and conflicts
 Siachen conflict
 Siachen Glacier

 Tourism and infrastructure
 India-China Border Roads
 Siachen Base Camp (India) 
 Tourism in Ladakh
	
 Geography
 Geology of the Himalaya 
 Indus-Yarlung suture zone
 List of districts of Ladakh

References

External links
https://www.drdo.gov.in/labs-and-establishments/defence-institute-high-altitude-research-dihar

1962 establishments in Jammu and Kashmir
Government agencies established in 1962
Defence Research and Development Organisation laboratories
Research and development in India
Research institutes established in 1962
Education in Ladakh